In enzymology, a mycothiol-dependent formaldehyde dehydrogenase is an enzyme that catalyzes the chemical reaction

formaldehyde + mycothiol + NAD+  S-formylmycothiol + NADH + 2 H+

The 3 substrates of this enzyme are formaldehyde, mycothiol, and NAD+, whereas its 3 products are S-formylmycothiol, NADH, and H+. This enzyme catalyses the following chemical reaction

This enzyme belongs to the family of oxidoreductases, specifically those acting on the aldehyde or oxo group of donor with NAD+ or NADP+ as acceptor.  The systematic name of this enzyme class is formaldehyde:NAD+ oxidoreductase (mycothiol-formylating). This enzyme is also called NAD/factor-dependent formaldehyde dehydrogenase or S-(hydroxymethyl)mycothiol dehydrogenase.

References

EC 1.1.1
NADH-dependent enzymes
Enzymes of unknown structure